James E. Golding (born November 23, 1977), also known by the stage name Japhia Life, is an American singer and hip hop musician. He has released six studio albums, Pages of Life: Chapter One (2000), Hell's Diary: The Healing LP (2004), Fountain of Life (2006), Nazareth (2010), Westside Pharmacy (2012), and The Profit (2014). His album Fountain of Life was his breakthrough release upon the Billboard charts.

Early life
Japhia Life was born James E. Golding on November 23, 1977, in Philadelphia, Pennsylvania, the son of Ed Golding.

Music career
His music recording career began in 2000 with his first studio album, Pages of Life: Chapter One, that was released by Ready Rock Records. The subsequent studio album, Hell's Diary: The Healing LP, was released in 2004, also from Arms Out Records in association with Kuklture Music Unlimited. He released Fountain of Life on March 21, 2006, with Beatmart Recordings. This album was his breakthrough, and peaked at No. 43. His fourth studio album, Nazareth, was released on April 5, 2010, from Arms Out Records. The fifth studio album, Westside Pharmacy, was released on November 20, 2012, through Arms Out Records. He released The Profit, on November 4, 2014, with Arms Out Records. The picture on the cover of The Profit is that of his mother.

Discography
Studio albums
 Pages of Life: Chapter One  (2000, Arms Out/Kulture)
 Hell's Diary: The Healing LP (2004, Arms Out/Kulture)
 Fountain of Life (March 21, 2006, Beatmart)
 Nazareth (April 5, 2010, Arms Out)
 Westside Pharmacy (November 20, 2012, Arms Out)
 The Profit (November 4, 2014, Arms Out)

References

External links
 
 Holy Hip Hop DataBase profile

1977 births
Living people
African-American male rappers
African-American Christians
American performers of Christian hip hop music
Rappers from Philadelphia
21st-century American rappers
21st-century African-American musicians
20th-century African-American people